Emre Kutalmış Ateşli (born 2001) is a Turkish taekwondo athlete.

Career 
Emre Kutalmış Ateşli has won a gold medal at theWorld Taekwondo Junior Championships held in Tunisia's Hammamet. He won the gold medal in the men's +87 kg event at the 2022 European Taekwondo Championships held in Manchester, England. He clinched gold at the 2022 World Taekwondo Grand Prix. Ateşli defeated Cheick Sallah from Ivory Coast to take the top prize in Rome during the men's +87 kg event final.

Tournament record

References 

2001 births
Turkish male taekwondo practitioners
Living people
Sportspeople from Tokat
Mediterranean Games bronze medalists for Turkey
Mediterranean Games medalists in taekwondo
Competitors at the 2018 Mediterranean Games
Competitors at the 2022 Mediterranean Games
European Taekwondo Championships medalists
21st-century Turkish people
Islamic Solidarity Games medalists in taekwondo
Islamic Solidarity Games competitors for Turkey